Gordon–Baughan–Warren House, also known as Boyd House, is a historic home located in Richmond, Virginia.  The original section was built about 1835, and is a -story, Greek Revival style vernacular frame dwelling. It was subsequently enlarged over the years in at least three building campaigns – c. 1860, c. 1910, and c. 1920.  The house is seven-bays wide and has an irregular plan.  Also on the property are the contributing guesthouse (c. 1860) and a garage (c. 1860, c. 1910).

It was listed on the National Register of Historic Places in 2006.

References

Houses on the National Register of Historic Places in Virginia
Greek Revival houses in Virginia
Houses completed in 1835
Houses in Richmond, Virginia
National Register of Historic Places in Richmond, Virginia